Baking Powder Creek is a stream in Lewis and Clark County, Montana, in the United States. The creek ends upon merging with Falls Creek.

Baking Powder Creek is noted for fishing of Cutthroat trout.

See also
List of rivers of Montana

References

Rivers of Lewis and Clark County, Montana
Rivers of Montana